is a Japanese talent and modeling agency.

History 
01familia was established in 2015 and its all-female talent roster includes models, tarento, actresses, and race queens. In February, talents affiliated with the company filled all the photo spread pages of issue number 9 of Weekly Playboy published that month, which the company referred to as the "Weekly Playboy Hijack". It was the first time in the magazine's history that a single company has dominated all the photo pages. The March 2021 special edition issue of the magazine B.L.T. would feature another "Zeroichi Hijack".

In October 2021, the company launched its official YouTube channel, Zeroichi TV, and first terrestrial monthly television program, on MBS TV. On 19 of the same month, the agency had acquired its first male affiliate, Ura Nanase.

Notable talents 

 Hikaru Aoyama
 Nashiko Momotsuki

References

External links 

 
 

Companies established in 2015
Modeling agencies
Japanese talent agencies